Lichtenstein's hartebeest (Alcelaphus buselaphus lichtensteinii) is a subspecies of the hartebeest antelope that dwells in savannahs and floodplains of Southeastern-Central Africa. It is sometimes classified as a unique species, Sigmoceros lichtensteinii.

It derives its name from zoologist Martin Lichtenstein.

Description
It has a red-brown colour, which is lighter on the underbelly. The horns found on both sexes appear from the side to be shaped like the letter 'S', and appear from the front to be shaped like the letter 'O' with its upper portions missing.

Behavior
They live on areas where they eat grasses. They are diurnal (active in the day). They gather in herds of five to 15 females and calves with a single male, which leads them. The male stands sentry duty on termite mounds and the like. Males hold large territories, which they mark by digging up soil with their horns around the borders. Lichtenstein's hartebeest have good eyesight but a poor sense of smell. Their main sounds are a bellow and a sneeze-snort sound.

They travel in herds. Herds are mainly kept between 1-10 individuals (89% of all LH in Tanzania have been within 1-10 animals. The herd may be composed of more than 10 individuals but it is seldom. (Booth 1985). It is noted that the highest number of Lichtenstein's Hartebeest congregating together occur in August/September. The exact reason is unknown however this is primarily when most calves are born. Add in local migration from other herds and it may a form of anti predator grouping to protect newborn calves. However, Bachelor males are often found alone countering the herd mentality  (Dowsett 1966; Wilson 1966; Rodgers 1977). Bachelor bulls do not establish territories while solitary bulls will exclude others from their domain (Dowsett 1966). The ratio of male to female LH is 1:2.37.

Lichtenstein's Hartebeest are very territorial mammals and there is no overlap in territories between bulls. The rutting period (breeding season) runs typically from mid October to January, although slight variations exist between different locations (Dowsett 1966). Bachelor bulls will often challenge alpha bulls until the point of complete exhaustion to take over the related female LHs. There are numerous stereotyped behaviour patterns in the repertoire of the genus Alcephalus that are directly associated with territorial defence (von Richter 1972). Amongst these, pawing and homing the earth are the most conspicuous. In Zimbabwe the most conspicuous body movements were the 'head-to-flank', in which the head is rubbed against the shoulder, and a 'head-flagging' movement in which the hartebeest shook its head up and down vigorously when alarmed. Hartebeests mark their territory by forming dung piles in their respective territories.

References 

Lichtenstein's hartebeest
Mammals of South Africa
Mammals of the Democratic Republic of the Congo
Mammals of Zambia
Mammals of Angola
Mammals of Mozambique
Mammals of Malawi
Mammals of Zimbabwe
Mammals of Southern Africa
Lichtenstein's hartebeest
Lichtenstein's hartebeest
Bovids of Africa
Taxobox binomials not recognized by IUCN